Well End may refer to:

Well End, Buckinghamshire
Well End, Hertfordshire